Lost My Mind may refer to:
 "Lost My Mind", a song by Lily Allen from No Shame
 "Lost My Mind", a song and extended play by Riton
 "Lost My Mind", a song by Matthew Sweet from 100% Fun
 "Lost My Mind", a song by Dillon Francis and Alison Wonderland
 "Lost My Mind", a song by They Might Be Giants from Nanobots

See also
"I Almost Lost My Mind", a 1950 song by Ivory Joe Hunter
Lost in My Mind (disambiguation)
Lose My Mind (disambiguation)